Florenţa Andreea Isărescu (born 3 July 1984) is a Romanian artistic gymnast who competed in international events between 1997 and 2000. She is an Olympic gold medalist and a world gold medalist with the team.

References

External links
 
 
 
 List of competitive results at Gymn Forum

Living people
1984 births
Romanian female artistic gymnasts
Gymnasts at the 2000 Summer Olympics
Olympic gymnasts of Romania
Olympic gold medalists for Romania
Medalists at the World Artistic Gymnastics Championships
Olympic medalists in gymnastics
Medalists at the 2000 Summer Olympics
Gymnasts from Bucharest
20th-century Romanian women
21st-century Romanian women